Brålanda Idrottsförening (English: Brålanda Sports Association) is a football club located in Brålanda, Sweden. Founded in 1909, the club now plays its home games on Sörbyvallen. The men's A-team is currently in Division 3 but the club features teams of all ages. 

Brålanda IF is a Swedish football club located in Brålanda

External links
Official site 

Football clubs in Västra Götaland County